The  is a diesel multiple unit (DMU) train type operated by Kyushu Railway Company exclusively on the Yufuin no Mori service in Kyushu, Japan.

One 3-car set was introduced on March 11, 1989 and was converted from former KiHa 58 and KiHa 65 DMU cars with new bodies. In April 1990, the train was lengthened to 4 cars with the addition of KiHa 70-2.

Formation

Source:

See also 
 Joyful Train

References

71
Kyushu Railway Company
Train-related introductions in 1989